Rościsław Żerelik (born 1956) is a Polish historian specializing in medieval history, history of supporting science, and the history of Silesia in the Middle Ages.

External links 
 Ludzie nauki (Polish)

1956 births
20th-century Polish historians
Polish male non-fiction writers
Living people
Recipients of the Order of Merit of the Federal Republic of Germany
21st-century Polish historians